Several Canadian naval units have been named HMCS Margaree.

 (II) served from 1957–1992 as a Cold War era .

Battle honours
Atlantic 1940

Set index articles on ships
Royal Canadian Navy ship names